Nidal (in Arabic نضال meaning warrior in Arabic) is a given name in Arabic. It may refer to:

Mohammad Nidal al-Shaar (born 1956), Syrian politician and government minister
Abou Nidal, Côte d'Ivoirian singer
Umm Nidal (1948–2013), Palestinian politician
Abu Nidal (1937–2002), founder of the militant Palestinian splinter group Fatah – The Revolutionary Council

People with the given name
Nidal Algafari (born 1965), Bulgaria-based director
Nidal A. Ayyad, one of the convicted perpetrators of 1993 World Trade Center bombing
Nidal Baba (born 1972), U.S. football (soccer) player / midfielder
Nidal Fat'hi Rabah Farahat (1971–2003), creator of the Qassam rocket
Nidal Malik Hasan (born 1970), former US Army major who perpetrated the 2009 Fort Hood shooting